Marouane Troudi (born 25 February 1990) is a retired Tunisian football midfielder.

References

1990 births
Living people
Tunisian footballers
JS Kairouan players
CA Bizertin players
Étoile Sportive du Sahel players
US Monastir (football) players
EGS Gafsa players
Association football midfielders
Tunisian Ligue Professionnelle 1 players